Póvoa de Lanhoso is a municipality in the district of Braga, Portugal. The population in 2011 was 21,886, in an area of 134.65 km².

The present Mayor is Avelino Silva, elected by the Social Democratic Party. The municipal holiday is March 19.

Economy
Agriculture, forestry and tourism are important economic activities in the municipality. Light industry is present too. Prozis, a multinational sports nutrition company headquartered in Esposende, has a major industrial plant in Póvoa de Lanhoso.

Parishes
The municipality is subdivided into the following 22 parishes:

 Águas Santas e Moure
 Calvos e Frades
 Campos e Louredo
 Covelas
 Esperança e Brunhais
 Ferreiros
 Fonte Arcada e Oliveira
 Galegos
 Garfe
 Geraz do Minho
 Lanhoso
 Monsul
 Póvoa de Lanhoso
 Rendufinho
 Santo Emilião
 São João de Rei
 Serzedelo
 Sobradelo da Goma
 Taíde
 Travassos
 Verim, Friande e Ajude
 Vilela

Notable people 
 Gonçalo Sampaio (1865 in São Gens de Calvos – 1937) a Portuguese botanist.
 Vítor Machado Ferreira (born 2000), known as Vitinha a footballer with over 60 club caps and one for Portugal

References

External links
Municipality official website
Photos from Póvoa de Lanhoso